My Own Way Home is the third album from Spanish singer Beth, released on 9 October 2006 in Spain. It was released in the UK on 11 September 2006. The disc contains ten songs (eight English tracks and two Spanish tracks).

Track listing
 Lullaby [2:29]
 Rain On Me [3:07]
 Deep Inside [2:57]
 All These Things [3:57]
 Hacerte Feliz [4:23]
 Angel [3:47]
 Home [3:49]
 Sad Song [3:03]
 Mama [4:17]
 Strange World [3:33]
 A Veces... (Hidden Track: "Suria") [10:21]

Bonus
 On És L'Amor (Mar De Fons Theme)

Charts

2006 albums
Beth (singer) albums